The Dead Don't Dream is a 1948 American Western film directed by George Archainbaud and written by Francis Rosenwald. The picture stars William Boyd, Andy Clyde, Rand Brooks, Mary Ware, John Parrish and Leonard Penn, and was released in 1948 by United Artists.

Plot 
Hopalong Cassidy investigates how and why three men died in a hotel room.

Cast 
 William Boyd as Hopalong Cassidy
 Andy Clyde as California Carlson
 Rand Brooks as Lucky Jenkins
 Mary Ware as Mary Benton
 John Parrish as Jeff Potter
 Leonard Penn as Earl Wesson
 Francis McDonald as Bart Lansing
 Richard Alexander as Duke 
 Bob Gabriel as Larry Potter
 Stanley Andrews as Jesse Williams
 Forbes Murray as Sheriff Tompson
 Don Haggerty as Deputy Sheriff

References

External links 
 
 
 
 

1948 films
American black-and-white films
Films directed by George Archainbaud
United Artists films
American Western (genre) films
1948 Western (genre) films
Hopalong Cassidy films
1940s English-language films
1940s American films